Cheri Huber (born c. 1944) is an American meditation teacher in the Sōtō School of Zen Buddhism tradition.

Biography
Huber is the founder and guiding teacher of Zen Monastery Peace Center located in Murphys, California, which was constructed in 1993. She was raised in the San Francisco Bay area and claims to have studied Zen under Jay DuPont. Writer Anna Kaplan says that Huber had once desired to live in a cabin in the woods in isolation of the world, but was encouraged by another teacher to teach Zen. The name of this teacher is not named. She founded her first Zen center in 1983 in Mountain View, California, which has since moved to Palo Alto under the name Palo Alto Zen Center. In 1997, Huber founded Living Compassion, a nonprofit organization dedicated to peace and service.

There have been some questions raised about her authority to teach Zen from some members of the Zen community. Author and ordained Buddhist priest James Ishmael Ford writes of her, "Perhaps the most prominent of apparently self-declared teachers is the widely read author and meditation teacher Cheri Huber. Huber may have studied briefly with Jay DuPont...but it is not clear that she was authorized to teach by him or anyone else as a Zen teacher."

Bibliography

As co-author

Audio

DVD

See also
Buddhism in the United States

References

External links
Living Compassion

1940s births
American women writers
Living people
Zen Buddhism writers
American Zen Buddhists
Female Buddhist spiritual teachers
21st-century American women